Sergio Jordan Moreno Aparicio (born 28 July 1992) is a Panamanian international footballer who plays for Unión Deportivo Universitario as a midfielder.

Career
Born in Panama City, Moreno has played for Chorrillo, Deportivo Municipal, Unión Deportivo Universitario, Al-Kawkab and Al-Riyadh.

He made his international debut for Panama in 2016.

References

1992 births
Living people
Panamanian footballers
Panama international footballers
Unión Deportivo Universitario players
Deportivo Municipal footballers
Al-Kawkab FC players
Al-Riyadh SC players
Liga Panameña de Fútbol players
Peruvian Primera División players
Saudi First Division League players
Saudi Second Division players
Association football midfielders
Panamanian expatriate footballers
Panamanian expatriate sportspeople in Peru
Expatriate footballers in Peru
Panamanian expatriates in Saudi Arabia
Expatriate footballers in Saudi Arabia